The Montreal Stock Exchange bombing was a domestic terrorist bombing of the Montreal Stock Exchange building in Montreal, Quebec, Canada, on Thursday, February 13, 1969. Perpetrated by the separatist Front de libération du Québec (FLQ), the bombing happened some 40 minutes before the end of trading, injuring 27 people. The blast destroyed a large portion of the trading floor, visitor gallery, and the building's northeast wall, causing nearly $1 million worth of property damage.

The attack was one of the FLQ's biggest in its bombing campaign, and was the culmination before the October Crisis of 1970.

References

1969 crimes in Canada
1960s in Montreal
1969 in Quebec
Attacks on buildings and structures in Canada
Building bombings in Canada
Stock Exchange bombing
February 1969 events in North America
Front de libération du Québec
Terrorist incidents in Canada in the 1960s
Terrorist incidents in North America in 1969

Far-left terrorism